Alessandra Querzola is an Italian set decorator born in Trieste. She is best known for her work on the 2017 film Blade Runner 2049 for which she was co-nominated for the Academy Award for Best Production Design.

Filmography
 2017: Blade Runner 2049
 2016: The Man from U.N.C.L.E. (set decorator: Italy) 
 2015: Avengers: Age of Ultron (location set decorator) 
 2015: Blackhat (assistant set decorator) 
 2014: Pompeii (set decorator: prep) 
 2012: Skyfall (assistant set decorator) 
 2010: The Tourist (assistant set decorator) 
 2009: Nine (assistant set decorator: Italy) 
 2008: Quantum of Solace (assistant set decorator) 
 2007: Charlie Wilson's War (set decorator: Morocco) 
 2005: Casanova (set dresser) 
 2005: Dominion: Prequel to the Exorcist (set decorator: Italy) 
 2004: The Life Aquatic with Steve Zissou (lead person) 
 2004: Envy (set decorator: Italy) 
 2003: The Order (assistant set decorator) / (lead set dresser) 
 2002: Gangs of New York (property coordinator) 
 2000: The Luzhin Defence (set dresser: Italy) 
 1999: The Children of the Century (set decorator: Italy) 
 1999: A Midsummer Night's Dream (assistant set decorator) / (lead set dresser) 
 1998: Dangerous Beauty (assistant set decorator) / (lead set dresser) 
 1997: Nel profondo paese straniero (assistant production designer) 
 1996: The English Patient (assistant set decorator) 
 1994: Only You (set decorator: Italy) 
 1992: The Timekeeper (Short) (set decorator/props coordinator: Italy) 
 1992: Inspector Morse (TV Series) (set decorator assistant - 1 episode) 
 1988: Provvisorio quasi d'amore (Short) (assistant art director)

References

External links 
 

Living people
Italian production designers
Year of birth missing (living people)